The Unifying Themes of Sex, Death and Religion is a compilation album by the American rock band Botch. Originally released through Excursion Records in 1997, the album compiled Botch's first two EPs—The John Birch Conspiracy Theory and Faction—with the song "Closure" which was previously released on the various artists compilation I Can't Live Without It.

After the original release went out of print, Excursion Records re-released The Unifying Themes of Sex, Death and Religion with eight additional tracks in 2002 as Unifying Themes Redux. The updated version featured new artwork and tracks that were previously released on Botch's split EPs with Nineironspitfire and Murder City Devils, various artists compilations and three previously unreleased tracks. Unifying Themes Redux was later reissued by Hydra Head Records in 2006, the label which also released Botch's two studio albums, American Nervoso and We Are the Romans, in addition to their posthumous EP An Anthology of Dead Ends.

Track listing

Personnel
Botch
 Brian Cook – bass guitar
 Dave Knudson – guitar
 Tim Latona – drum kit
 Dave Verellen – vocals

Production
 Matt Bayles – recording at Litho Studios (tracks 15, 16)
 Jake Snider – recording (tracks 5–11, 14)
 Wes – recording at Uptone Studios (tracks 1–4, 12, 13)

References

External links
The Unifying Themes of Sex, Death and Religion at Discogs
Unifying Themes Redux at Discogs

Botch (band) albums
Albums produced by Matt Bayles
1997 compilation albums
Hydra Head Records compilation albums